Salicornia perennis, synonym Sarcocornia perennis, otherwise known as perennial glasswort, is a species of halophytic perennial plant within the family Amaranthaceae. It has a widespread but patchy native distribution, being found in parts of Western Europe, northern and southern Africa, North America from southeast Alaska to south Mexico, the Caribbean, and South America. It is native to the coasts of southern Britain and Ireland, where it is classified as nationally scarce. The species flowers between July and October.

References

perennis
Flora of Southwestern Europe
Flora of Southeastern Europe
Flora of Africa
Flora of North America
Flora of South America